Pseudoflavitalea rhizosphaerae is a Gram-negative and aerobic bacterium from the genus of Pseudoflavitalea which has been isolated from the rhizosphere of a tomato plant from Buyeo-gun in Korea.

References

External links
Type strain of Pseudoflavitalea rhizosphaerae at BacDive -  the Bacterial Diversity Metadatabase

Sphingobacteriia
Bacteria described in 2016